Croizatia is a small genus of plants in the Phyllanthaceae first described as a genus in 1952. It is native to Panama and to northwestern South America. It is dioecious, with male and female flowers on separate plants.

species
 Croizatia brevipetiolata (Secco) Dorr - Colombia, NW Venezuela
 Croizatia cimalonia Cerón & G.L.Webster - Ecuador
 Croizatia naiguatensis Steyerm. - N Colombia, N Venezuela
 Croizatia neotropica Steyerm. - N Venezuela, Vaupés in E Colombia
 Croizatia panamensis G.L.Webster - Panama, NW Colombia

References

Phyllanthaceae
Phyllanthaceae genera
Dioecious plants